Wise Guys (original title: Les Godelureaux) is a 1961 French revenge drama directed by Claude Chabrol and based on the novel by Éric Ollivier.

Plot
Ronald (Jean-Claude Brialy) is publicly humiliated by Arthur (Charles Belmont) and plots to destroy Arthur's life, using Ambroisine (Bernadette Lafont) as bait.

Cast
Jean-Claude Brialy as Ronald
Bernadette Lafont as Ambroisine
 as Arthur
Jean Galland as Arthur's uncle
Pierre Vernier as Bernard 2
Sacha Briquet as Henri
Stéphane Audran as Xavière
 Jean Tissier as le président
 Laura Carli as Aunt Suzanne

External links

1961 films
1960s thriller films
French thriller films
Films directed by Claude Chabrol
Films with screenplays by Paul Gégauff
Films shot in Saint-Tropez
Films based on French novels
1960s French films